Digama marchalii is a moth of the family Erebidae. It is found in southern India and Myanmar.

Subspecies
Digama marchalii figurata (Myanmar)
Digama marchalii intermedia (southern India)
Digama marchalii marchalii (southern India)
Digama marchalii nebulosa (southern India)

External links
 Species info

Aganainae
Moths described in 1843